Kalateh-ye Now (also Romanized as Kalāteh-ye Now and Kalāteh Now; also known as Kalāt-e Now, Kalāteh Miyānrūd, Kalāteh-ye Mīān Rūd, Mīān Rūd, and Miyan Rood) is a village in Arabkhaneh Rural District, Shusef District, Nehbandan County, South Khorasan Province, Iran. At the 2006 census, its population was 91, in 23 families.

References 

Populated places in Nehbandan County